Live at Berkeley is a live album by American rock musician Jimi Hendrix. It documents his second performance at the Berkeley Community Theatre on May 30, 1970, and was released by MCA Records on September 16, 2003.

Background
Hendrix performed in Berkeley about one month into his The Cry of Love Tour with bassist Billy Cox and drummer Mitch Mitchell. The set list was fairly typical for the toura mix of popular tunes and some newer material. "Hey Joe", "Foxey Lady", "Purple Haze", and "Voodoo Child (Slight Return)" had been in Hendrix's concert repertoire since he first recorded them. "Machine Gun" was released two months earlier on the live Band of Gypsys album, and "Hey Baby (New Rising Sun)" was in development for his planned fourth studio album. Portions of some of these songs were included in the 1971 concert film Jimi Plays Berkeley.

Critical reception 

Rob Fawcett of BBC Music called Live at Berkeley "the strongest newly-released Hendrix material in a long time". Robert Christgau cited "Hey Baby (New Rising Sun)" and "I Don't Live Today" as highlights and deemed it "the Cox-Mitchell band at its most documentable" in his consumer guide for The Village Voice. In his review for Blender, he said Cox was a significant improvement over Noel Redding in a group that was Hendrix's best. Uncut magazine was less enthusiastic and felt "there are still better versions of these tracks elsewhere."

Track listing

Personnel 
Musicians
Jimi Hendrixguitar, vocals
Billy Coxbass guitar
Mitch Mitchelldrums

Production
 Janie L. Hendrix – compilation production 
 Eddie Kramer – compilation production, mixing
 George Marino – mastering
 John McDermott – compilation production
 Pete Scriba – assistant engineering

References

External links 
 

Live albums published posthumously
Jimi Hendrix live albums
2003 live albums
MCA Records live albums